Nuclear factor of activated T-cells, cytoplasmic 4 is a protein that in humans is encoded by the NFATC4 gene.

Function 

The product of this gene is a member of the nuclear factors of activated T cells DNA-binding transcription complex. This complex consists of at least two components: a preexisting cytosolic component that translocates to the nucleus upon T cell receptor (TCR) stimulation and an inducible nuclear component. Other members of this family of nuclear factors of activated T cells also participate in the formation of this complex. The product of this gene plays a role in the inducible expression of cytokine genes in T cells, especially in the induction of the IL-2 and IL-4.

Interactions 

NFATC4 has been shown to interact with CREB-binding protein.

See also 
 NFAT

References

Further reading

External links 
 

Transcription factors
Human proteins